The Blue Streak was a wooden roller coaster built in 1937 at Conneaut Lake Park in Conneaut Lake, Pennsylvania. It was the only wooden coaster operating in the park, as well as the largest. The Blue Streak followed an out and back design. It was the 17th oldest wooden roller coaster in the United States, and it was one of two shallow coasters designed by Ed Vettel still operating until 2021. The Blue Streak first opened in 1938. Upon leaving the station, the train immediately entered a tunnel in the shape of an “S" and began a 78-foot-high climb up the lift hill. The train plummeted down the first drop, reaching up to a top speed of 50 mph, and went into a straightaway section of track. The straightaway was followed by two medium size hills, then a turnaround section that featured a slight dip as it turned the train back towards the station. The train then followed four smaller camel back hills, providing airtime, then entering the brake run and making a 360 degree turn back into the station.

History 
The Blue Streak underwent major renovations in 1997, 2002, and 2010. In 2002, one of the original 1938 Vettel trains was returned to service, replacing the silver National Amusement Devices Century Flyer train used since the 1960s. The Vettel train was again removed in 2011 pending repairs and restraint updates. The turnaround section of track was rebuilt. For the 2016 season, the first drop was repaired and re-tracked. In 2018, the second drop was repaired and re-tracked. The ride received salvaged lumber from the Geauga Lake Raging Wolf Bobs coaster.

The Blue Streak has been opened and closed many times. The dates are as follows,
Originally opened: May 23, 1938
Closed: 1995-1996
Reopened: May 17, 1997
Closed: 2007-September 1, 2010
Reopened: September 2, 2010      
Final closure: Closed after the 2019 operating season. Stood standing but out of operation from 2020-2022.
On June 24, 2010, the American Coaster Enthusiasts donated a plaque that declared the Blue Streak a Coaster Classic and a Coaster Landmark.

On January 4, 2022, during demolition of the ride, the Blue Streak caught on fire.

Awards

Note: From 1999–2010 the Blue Streak did not chart in the Golden Ticket Awards.

References

External links

Official Site
American Coaster Enthusiasts listing for Blue Streak

Roller coasters in Pennsylvania
Roller coasters introduced in 1937
1937 establishments in Pennsylvania
2022 fires in the United States
Fires in Pennsylvania